Events from the year 1957 in Scotland.

Incumbents 

 Secretary of State for Scotland and Keeper of the Great Seal – James Stuart until 13 January; then John Maclay

Law officers 
 Lord Advocate – William Rankine Milligan
 Solicitor General for Scotland – William Grant

Judiciary 
 Lord President of the Court of Session and Lord Justice General – Lord Clyde
 Lord Justice Clerk – Lord Thomson
 Chairman of the Scottish Land Court – Lord Gibson

Events 
 6 January – fishery cruiser Vaila runs aground off the Isle of Lewis with the loss of 5 crew.
 5 February – trawler Robert Limbrick runs aground on the Isle of Mull with the loss of all 12 crew.
 29 March – the Royal Navy base at Scapa Flow in Orkney is reduced to an oil depot.
 9 May – a major fire in Edinburgh destroys the premises and stock of William Mutrie & Sons, theatrical costumiers, at Bell's Brae.
 16 August – the world's first Museum of Childhood (established by optician Patrick Murray) opens in its own premises on Edinburgh's Royal Mile.
 31 August – central Scotland's independent channel, Scottish Television, goes on air.
 18 September – the sports programme Scotsport begins airing on Scottish Television; by the time it ends in 2008 it is recognised as the world's longest running television sports magazine.
 1 October – transfer of criminally insane prisoners from the criminal lunatic department at HM Prison Perth to the State Institution for Mental Defectives at Carstairs which becomes the State Mental Hospital.
 5 October – RAF Saxa Vord radar station on Unst is returned to fully operational status.
 18 October – a Royal Air Force Gloster Meteor jet trainer aircraft crashes near Kirkcaldy with the loss of her 2 crew.
 1 November – a replacement "Bawbee Brig" is opened across the River Leven, Fife, to connect Leven and Methil within Levenmouth.
 19 November – an underground explosion at Kames Colliery near Muirkirk kills 17.
 14 December – an underground explosion at Lindsay Colliery in Fife kills 9.
 Construction of a missile testing range on South Uist begins.
 First purpose-built Kingdom Hall of Jehovah's Witnesses in Scotland completed at Riddrie, Glasgow.
 Folklorist F. Marian McNeill begins publication of The Silver Bough.

Births 
 9 February – Gordon Strachan, international footballer and manager
 27 March – Billy Mackenzie, singer (commits suicide 1997)
 7 June – 
Michael Bowes-Lyon, 18th Earl of Strathmore and Kinghorne, soldier and politician (died 2016)
Iain Gray, Scottish Labour Party leader
 16 June – Leeona Dorrian, Lady Dorrian, Lord Justice Clerk 2016–present
 11 July – Johann Lamont, Scottish Labour Party leader
 23 September – Fergus Ewing, Scottish National Party minister
 6 October – Moray Hunter, comedian
 21 October – Irene Edgar, lawn bowler
 22 December – Ricky Ross, singer-songwriter and broadcaster
 Blair Jenkins, broadcaster
 Alan Riach, poet and academic

Deaths 
 January – Harry Gordon, entertainer (born 1893)
 21 April – John Graham Kerr, embryologist and Unionist Member of Parliament (born 1869)
 10 June – Sir Douglas MacInnes Shaw, army officer, businessman and Unionist Member of Parliament (born 1895)
 20 October – Jack Buchanan, actor, singer and film director (born 1891)

The arts
 Song of the Clyde (setting by Ian Gourlay of lyrics by R. Y. Bell) is published.

See also 
 1957 in Northern Ireland

References 

 
Scotland
Years of the 20th century in Scotland
1950s in Scotland